Quality Distributors FC are a professional association football (soccer) club in Guam. They play in the Guam Soccer League. Their victory in the 2009–10 championship was achieved with a 100% score – played 20, won 20 matches.

Honors
Guam Men's Soccer League 
 2007, 2007–08, 2008–09, 2009–10, 2011–12 Winners 

Guam FA Cup 
 2008, 2009, 2011, 2012

References

Football clubs in Guam
2001 establishments in Guam
Association football clubs established in 2001